In cellular automata, a replicator is a pattern that produces copies of itself. 

In the one-dimensional Rule 90 cellular automaton, every pattern is a replicator. The same is true in the life-like cellular automaton rule Replicator (B1357/S1357).

Highlife (B36/S23) rule has a simple replicator.

On November 23, 2013, Dave Greene built the first replicator in Conway's Game of Life (B3/S23).

References

External links
Cellular Automata: Replicators
Life lexicon: replicator

Cellular automaton patterns